Khalil Janahi is a citizen of Bahrain and Dubai who was arrested and held in Saudi Arabia in April 2007. According to Abdullah Hashim lawyer for the Bahrain's National Justice Movement, speaking in July 2008, Janahi's extrajudicial detention, and that of fellow Bahraini Abdurahim Al Murbati, was of "urgent importance, given their length of time in custody without charge."

Although charges were never laid against Janahi he is reported to have been apprehended on suspicion of an association with al-Qaeda. He spent his first four months under arbitrary detention at ʽUlaysha Prison without access to his family. In September, he was moved from the al-Ha'ir prison to a more lenient facility.

On 27 November 2008 the Gulf Daily News reported that Janahi had been transferred to a prison in Dubai on 24 November 2008.  Janahi was freed on 11 June 2009, without having had access to lawyers, without any charges laid and without a trial, in either Saudi Arabia or Dubai.

References

Bahraini people imprisoned abroad
Living people
Prisoners and detainees of Saudi Arabia
Prisoners and detainees of the United Arab Emirates
Year of birth missing (living people)